Thomas Drumm may refer to:

 Thomas E. Drumm (1909–1990), U.S. government official
 Thomas William Drumm (1871–1933), American Roman Catholic Church bishop